Elijah Gates (December 17, 1827 in Garrard County, Kentucky – March 4, 1915 in St. Joseph, Missouri) was an American politician, and colonel in the Confederate States Army during the American Civil War.

Early and personal life
Gates moved to Platte County, Missouri, sometime around 1846, and subsequently settled on a farm in Buchanan County. In 1852, he married Maria Stamper, and they had twelve children.

Military career
At the outbreak of the Civil War in 1861, Gates enlisted in the Confederate Army, starting as a captain in the Missouri State Guard under the command of General Sterling Price, and was later promoted to colonel of the 1st Missouri Cavalry Regiment. He commanded his regiment at the Battle of Pea Ridge, Arkansas in March 1862, during the Siege of Corinth, Mississippi, and at the Battles of Iuka, Second Corinth, Champion Hill, Big Black River Bridge and at the Siege of Vicksburg, Mississippi. He also temporarily commanded the 1st Missouri Brigade. In 1864, Gates participated in the Atlanta Campaign and the Battle of Allatoona, Georgia, and lost an arm at the Battle of Franklin, Tennessee. During his service, he was wounded five times, captured by Union forces three times, and had four horses shot from underneath him. On April 9, 1865, the same day Confederate General Robert E. Lee surrendered to Union General Ulysses S. Grant, Colonel Gates was engaged in one of the last battles of the Civil War, the Battle of Fort Blakeley in Alabama.

Political career
Following the war, Gates returned to his farm. In 1874, he was elected as Sheriff of Buchanan County, serving in that post until 1877. From 1877 to 1881, he served as State Treasurer of Missouri. Following his tenure as State Treasurer, he served as United States Marshal for the Western District of Missouri under President Grover Cleveland, and was engaged in the transfer and bus business in St. Joseph, Missouri until his death at 87 years old.

References

1827 births
1915 deaths
State treasurers of Missouri
People from Platte County, Missouri
Politicians from St. Joseph, Missouri
People from Garrard County, Kentucky
Confederate States Army officers
People of Kentucky in the American Civil War
People of Missouri in the American Civil War
Missouri sheriffs
Missouri Democrats
United States Marshals
Missouri State Guard
American politicians with disabilities
American amputees